Aung Zabu Forest Monastery (Aung Zabu Tawya Dhamma Yeiktha), commonly known as Japan Paya is a Buddhist monastery (kyaung) in, Hmawbi Township

The monastery is known for a collection of 301 historic Buddha images from the Pagan, Pinnya, Ava, Toungoo, Nyaungyan, Tagaung and Konbaung eras. The images were donated by a Japanese national named Kumano in 2012. Over 10,000 visitors per week visit the monastery.

See also 
 Kyaung
 Thayettaw Monastery

References 

Monasteries in Myanmar
Buildings and structures in Yangon Region